CKMW-FM is a Canadian radio station licensed to Winkler, Manitoba, serving the Pembina Valley Region broadcasting at 88.9 FM with a country format branded as Country 88. The station is currently owned & operated by Golden West Broadcasting.

CKMW shares its location with sister stations CJEL-FM and CFAM.

History 
It first began broadcasting at 6 a.m. on August 1, 1980 at 1530 kHz with the call sign CISV, before moving to 1570 kHz and adopting its current call sign in 1987.

Move to FM
On July 16, 2012, Golden West received approval from the Canadian Radio-television and Telecommunications Commission (CRTC) to convert CKMW from the AM band to the FM band. The new frequency previously assigned was 103.7 MHz. On January 8, 2013, the CRTC granted permission for CKMW to broadcast instead on 88.9 MHz, as well as increasing the average effective radiated power (ERP) from 61,000 to 100,000 watts (maximum ERP remains at 100,000 watts) and changing from a directional to a non-directional antenna. The station relaunched as Country 88.9 at 88.9 FM on June 12, 2013. Following its move to FM, CKMW was permitted to simulcast on both AM and FM for a transition period of three months, ending in September; the station ceased broadcasting on AM 1570 on August 30, 2013.

References

External links
Country 88.9
 
 (88.9 MHz)
 (Old 1570 kHz frequency)

Kmw
Kmw
Kmw
Morden, Manitoba
Winkler, Manitoba
Radio stations established in 1980
1980 establishments in Manitoba